The former Piqua High School, built in 1914, is an historic building located at 316 North College Street in Piqua, Ohio. Also known as Piqua Central High School, it was designed by Harvard and Merriam in the Classical Revival style.

On August 22, 1996, the building was added to the National Register of Historic Places.

See also
 Piqua High School

References

School buildings on the National Register of Historic Places in Ohio
Buildings and structures in Miami County, Ohio
National Register of Historic Places in Miami County, Ohio
School buildings completed in 1914
1914 establishments in Ohio